Pramod Paliwal (born 1968) is an author, academician, expert in  Energy Sector Management  and  Energy Security. He is a Fellow of The Chartered Institute of Marketing, U.K. and is on the panel of Chair of Indian Studies Abroad in Energy Studies at Indian Council for Cultural Relations (ICCR), Ministry of External Affairs, Govt. of India. Paliwal is associated with the international crowdsourcing organization Wikistrat as an Honorary Senior Analyst in the area of energy. He has an interest in  Natural Gas Distribution industry and Energy Branding.

Education and personal life

He is married and has two children.

Career, publications and conferences
Paliwal is a professor at the School of Petroleum Management, Pandit Deendayal Energy University, Gandhinagar-Gujarat, India. In profession since 1991, his earlier associations have been with ACC Limited (now, a subsidiary of the Adani Group; formerly Holcim Group), Pacific Institute of Management, Mohanlal Sukhadia University, India, and the India Offshore Campus of Oxford Brookes University, U.K. He sits on the Academic Advisory Board of CHARGE Energy Branding Conference, Iceland.

Paliwal contributed to "International Gas Union 2009–2012 Triennium Work Report: Building Strategic Human Capital" authored by Ieda Gomes, United Kingdom. He also contributed to the study "Promoting Energy Savings in India's Transportation Sector" with the Institute of Energy Economics Japan (IEEJ), Tokyo and METI (Ministry of Economy, Trade and Industry). (2014–15)

Apart from publishing many research papers and book chapters in Management, Marketing and  Energy Industry, he has authored books on  B2B Marketing and Natural Gas Distribution. These include McGraw-Hill International “Cases in Business Marketing’ (with co-authors Ramendra Singh and Sudhir Yadav), ‘Natural Gas Transmission and Distribution Business’ by Routledge (with co-author Sudhir Yadav) and its special Indian edition (with co-author Sudhir Yadav).

He has been invited as a speaker at Natural Gas Distribution industry international forums, spanning across India, Europe, Middle East, North Africa, Southeast Asia and the United States.

References

1968 births
Living people
Mohanlal Sukhadia University alumni